This is a list of yearly Southern Intercollegiate Athletic Conference football standings.

SIAC standings

References

Standings
Southern Intercollegiate Athletic Conference
College football-related lists